The term "half dollar" refers to a half-unit of several currencies that are named "dollar". One dollar ($1) is normally divided into subsidiary currency of 100 cents, so a half dollar is equal to 50 cents. These half dollars (aka 50 cent pieces) are denominated as either Coins or as banknotes. Although more than a dozen countries have their own unique dollar currency, not all of them use a 50 cent piece or half dollar. This article only includes half dollars and 50 cent pieces that were intended for circulation, those that add up to units of dollars, and those in the form of a coin.

Note: The blue linked years included in the tables link to articles about the coins.

Currently minted

Formerly minted

Notes

References

Fifty-cent coins